The Admiralty Advocate was one of the Law Officers of the Crown. He represented the Crown in the High Court of Admiralty from 1661 to 1867. He was also known as the Advocate for the Affairs of the Admiralty.

History
The post was first established in 1661 with the post holder representing the Crown in the High Court of Admiralty. After 1875, when the Admiralty Court became part of the Probate, Divorce and Admiralty Division of the new High Court of Justice, the office became obsolete.

Admiralty Advocates after 1660
Included:
 29 October 1661: William Turner
 date unknown: Sir Walter Walker
 19 May 1674: Richard Lloyd
 13 September 1685: Thomas Pinfold
 17 July 1686: William Oldiss
 17 September 1693: Fisher Littleton
 26 January 1694: Henry Newton (temporarily during the illness of Littleton)
 16 March 1697: Henry Newton (permanently)
 15 November 1704: Nathaniel Lloyd (deputy during the absence of Newton)
 28 October 1714: Henry Penrice
 15 August 1715: Richard Fuller
 30 March 1727: Exton Sayer
 1 October 1731: Edmund Ishan
 20 March 1741: William Strahan
 9 August 1748: Thomas Salusbury
 14 November 1751: Charles Pinfold, junior
 15 February 1756: John Bettesworth
 14 June 1764: George Harris
 1 May 1782: William Scott
 4 September 1788: Thomas Bever
 12 November 1791: William Battine
 1 March 1801: Sir Christopher Robinson
 25 November 1811: James Henry Arnold
 11 March 1829: John Dodson
 25 October 1834: Joseph Phillimore
 1855: Robert Joseph Phillimore
 1862: Travers Twiss
 1867: James Parker Deane

Citations

Sources
 Office, Admiralty (March 1828). "Judicial Department". The Navy List. London, England: John Murray.
 Haydn, Joseph; Ockerby, Horace (1969). The Book of Dignities (1894) (Reprint ed.). London, England: W. H. Allen & Co.

External links

Law Officers of the Royal Navy
Courts of England and Wales
High Court of Justice
English admiralty law
Admiralty law in the United Kingdom
Law Officers of the Crown in the United Kingdom